Kestel is a district of Bursa Province in the Marmara region of Turkey. It is located 14 km east of Bursa city center on the road to Turanköy.

References

Districts of Bursa Province